In fractal geometry, the Higuchi dimension (or Higuchi fractal dimension (HFD)) is an approximate value for the box-counting dimension of the graph of a real-valued function or time series. This value is obtained via an algorithmic approximation so one also talks about the Higuchi method. It has many applications in science and engineering and has been applied to subjects like characterizing primary waves in seismograms, clinical neurophysiology and analyzing changes in the electroencephalogram in Alzheimer’s disease.

Formulation of the method 
The original formulation of the method is due to T. Higuchi.

 

The length  is defined by the average value of the  lengths ,

 

The slope of the best-fitting linear function through the data points  is defined to be the Higuchi fractal dimension of the time-series .

Application to functions 
For a real-valued function  one can partition the unit interval  into  equidistantly intervals  and apply the Higuchi algorithm to the times series . This results into the Higuchi fractal dimension of the function .

Robustness and stability 
Applications to fractional Brownian functions and the Weierstrass function reveal that the Higuchi fractal dimension can be close to the box-dimension. On the other hand, the method can be unstable in the case where the data  are periodic or if subsets of it lie on a horizontal line (see Liehr & Massopust 2020).

References 

 Fractals
 Algorithms